Miskin (c. 1560 - c. 1604), also known as Miskina, was a Mughal painter in the court of Akbar I. The name 'Miskin' itself is a pen name. Miskin is recorded by the historian and grand vizier of Akbar, Abu'l-Fazl, in a record containing a list of prominent Mughal painters. Further, he is regarded as an extremely skilled painter of animals.

Life and work 
Miskin was likely born around the year 1560, with little additional information being known about his early life save for his father, Mahesh, and brother, 'Asi, also working as artists.

References 

Mughal painters
Court painters
17th-century Indian painters
16th-century Indian painters
Indian male painters
Animal painters